Franz Feuchtmayer may refer to:

 Franz Joseph Feuchtmayer (1660–1718), sculptor and stuccoist
 Franz Xaver Feuchtmayer (1705–1764), German Baroque stucco plasterer
 Franz Xaver Feuchtmayer the Younger (born 1735), German artist